The Mary Phifer McKenzie House, now the Sweetwater Branch Inn Bed and Breakfast, is an historic house located at 617 East University Avenue in Gainesville, Florida.  It was added to the National Register of Historic Places in 1982.

The house was constructed in about 1895 and is an irregularly massed two-and-a-half-story Queen Anne-style home.

It is known as one of the most elaborate Victorian buildings ever constructed in Gainesville. It has intricate Eastlake architecture details and a fanciful restored massing. It has three-story octagonal turrets on the west face, a wrap-around veranda, and octagonal gazebo.

The Sweetwater Inn includes two carefully restored Victorian-era mansions (the McKenzie House and the Cushman-Colson House, as well as charming guest cottages, a modern reception hall and beautifully sculptured gardens.

History
Perry Colson purchased the home in 1903 and sold it to William Turner Pound, the first husband of Mary Phifer. In the 1920s Mary Phifer married Reid Hill McKenzie. She lived in the McKenzie house until she was 83 years old.

This property is now the location of five beautifully appointed Sweetwater Inn guest rooms.

The Holbrook family, the current owners and innkeepers, purchased the property, that had been neglected, in 1978. Giovanna and Juan Holbrook began restoring it to its original beauty and charm. Giovanna Holbrook and her daughter Cornelia later purchased and restored the Cushman-Colson House in 1992.

Media coverage
The inn was featured on the PBS television series, Inn Country USA.

See also
National Register of Historic Places listings in Alachua County, Florida

References

External links
 Alachua County listings at Florida's Office of Cultural and Historical Programs
 Alachua County's Department of Growth Management
 Virtual tour of Northeast Historic District, Gainesville
 Southeast Historic District, Gainesville
 Sweetwater Branch Inn

Buildings and structures in Gainesville, Florida
Houses on the National Register of Historic Places in Florida
National Register of Historic Places in Gainesville, Florida
Houses in Alachua County, Florida
Bed and breakfasts in Florida
Queen Anne architecture in Florida
1890s establishments in Florida
Houses completed in the 19th century